The comptroller general of South Carolina is a constitutional officer in the executive branch of the U.S. state of South Carolina. Forty individuals have held the office of comptroller general since 1800. The incumbent is Richard Eckstrom, a Republican.

The South Carolina Code of Laws of 1976, Title 11, Chapter 3 describes the responsibilities of the Office of the Comptroller General.

Powers and duties
In South Carolina, the comptroller general serves as the chief accountant and watchdog of state government. As such, the comptroller general monitors state spending, issues warrants authorizing the payment of funds out of the state treasury, maintains the state's accounting system, establishes internal controls for state agencies, provides financial services to state agencies and local governments, and prepares reports on the financial operations and condition of state government. In addition, all payrolls for state employees, vouchers for bills owed by the state, and interdepartmental payments between state agencies are submitted to the comptroller general for processing. In these respects, the Office of the Comptroller General examines all payments to ensure they are properly authorized by agency officials, that funds are available to cover them, and that they are properly classified in the state's accounting system.

Aside from his or her functional responsibilities, the comptroller general is a member of the State Fiscal Accountability Authority (SFAA). The SFAA is an independent agency that provides insurance to state agencies and local governments, procures goods and services for state agencies, and oversees the construction and maintenance of state buildings. The SFAA also appoints South Carolina's state auditor to serve at pleasure; the state auditor is a statutory official that functions as the external auditor of state government.

List of Comptrollers General 
Though the office of the comptroller general was created at the end of the 19th Century, there were individuals holding that title since the beginning of the century, less than twenty years after admission of the state to the Union in 1788.

Comptrollers General of the 19th Century 

 Paul Hamilton, 1800–1804 — Hamilton's title was "Finance Comptroller" and he was the first person to hold this title.
 Thomas Lee, 1804–1817
 George Warren Cross, 1817-1817
 Robert Creswell, 1817–1819
 John Stevens Cogdell, 1819–1821
 Thomas Lee (serving a second time), 1821–1822
 Benjamin T. Elmore, 1822–1826
 Alexander Speer, 1826–1830
 Thomas Harrison, 1830–1834
 William Laval, 1834–1838
 William C. Balck, 1846–1850
 James B. McCully, 1850–1854
 John D. Ashemore, 1854–1858
 Thomas J. Pickens, 1858–1862
 James A. Black, 1862–1866
 Simon L. Leaphart, 1866–1868
 John L. Neagle, 1868–1872
 Solomon L. Hoge, 1872–1874
 Thomas C. Dunn, 1874–1877
 Johnson Hagood, 1876–1880
 John Bratton, 1880–1882
 William E. Stoney, 1882–1886
 John S. Verner, 1886–1890
 William H. Ellerbe, 1890–1894
 James W. Horton, 1894–1897
 Layfayette P. Epton, 1897–1899

Comptrollers General of the 20th Century 

 John P. Derham, 1899–1903
 Adolphus W. Jones, 1903–1915
 Carlton W. Sawyer, 1915–1918
 R. Lyles Osborne, 1918–1920
 Wilbert Sutherland, 1920–1921
 Walter E. Duncan, 1921–1925
 A. J. Beattie, 1925–1943
 Eldridge C. Rhodes, 1943–1967
 J. Henry Mills, 1967–1976
 Earle E. Morris, Jr., 1976–1999

Comptrollers General of the 21st century 

 Jim Lander, 1999–2003
 Richard Eckstrom, 2003–

References

State agencies of South Carolina
1868 establishments in South Carolina
 
South Carolina